Aliens: A Comic Book Adventure is a 1995 adventure game developed by Cryo Interactive Entertainment and published by Mindscape for MS-DOS. It is loosely based on the Aliens comic book series with many references to the graphic novel Labyrinth.

Plot
Players take on the role of Lt. Col. Henry Hericksen, an ex-Colonial Marine aboard the USS Sheridan who is now the commander of a three-man terraforming team tasked with investigating a distress call originating from a remote outpost known as B54C. Players must search through a mining complex for clues.

The main protagonist, Lt. Col. Henricksen, is a nod to famed sci-fi actor Lance Henriksen, who played the android Bishop in Aliens and Alien³, and Charles Bishop Weyland in Alien vs. Predator. Towards the end of the game, players encounter a "Space Jockey” like huge dead creature found in the spaceship in the first Alien movie.

Development and release

In 1994, Cryo Interactive were instructed to create an adventure game based on the Aliens comic book series being published by Dark Horse Comics at the time, with Mindscape acting as the game's publisher.

In October 1994, the USA version was finished and Mindscape duplicated 120,000 pieces for Christmas sales. In December 1994, Fox sued Mindscape for copyright violation and gave Mindscape the right to sell the stock, but not to continue to duplicate and market the product. The whole staff in Mindscape US and Mindscape UK were fired and the German and French version of the game were released unfinished.

Reception
Upon its release, the game received mixed to mostly negative reviews. In a retrospective article, Alexa Ray Corriea and Danielle Riendeau of Polygon wrote Aliens: A Comic Book Adventure "not only made the Aliens feel scary, but added a little more to the franchise by spinning different plot threads through the game." According to Pete Worth of Thunderbolt, "The game featured some high-end graphics and a certain degree of tension but the inventory-based puzzles and grid-based combat were often tedious. Still, it was interesting to see xenomorphs regain their fear-inducing deadliness after being reduced to mere cannon-fodder so often in other games."

On the other hand, Stephen Cleckner of GamesBeat opined "Aliens: The Comic Book Adventure is a frustratingly plodding and tedious excuse of a game." He recommended to "sit through a Let's Play video if you need to experience this thing. For your sake, don’t actually try to play it." In 1996, Computer Gaming World ranked it as the #24 Worst Game of All Time as "bad art, plot and action shame the Dark Horse comic series on which it was based."

References

External links
Aliens: A Comic Book Adventure at MobyGames

1995 video games
Adventure games
Alien (franchise) games
Cryo Interactive games
DOS games
DOS-only games
Single-player video games
Video games based on comics
Video games developed in France
Mindscape games